Tax Code of Azerbaijan is the primary tax law in Azerbaijan. The Code establishes general principles of taxation In Azerbaijan, sets the rules for determining, payment and collection of taxes, identifies the rights and responsibilities of taxpayers and tax authorities, as well as the liabilities for violation of tax legislation.

The Code was adopted by former President of Azerbaijan Heydar Aliyev on July 11, 2000 and entered into force in January 2001.

Structure 
The Tax Code of Azerbaijan consists of 17 chapters and 221 articles. The chapters are as follows:

General provisions regarding tax relations, rights and responsibilities of taxpayers and tax agents, as well as tax agencies, tax control processes are defined, moreover, responsibilities for violation of tax legislation and the process of appealing of decisions of tax authorities are identified, finally general rules for tax payments are mentioned in the General part of the Code.

The Special part of the Code separately defines specific taxes like income tax, profit tax, VAT, tax on land, road tax, mining tax and simplified tax, as well as the procedures related to these taxes are detailed in this part.

Classification of taxes 

Tax is defined as “a compulsory, individual and non-refundable payment made to the state or local budget in the form of collection of monetary means from taxpayers with the purpose of providing the financial basis to the state and municipal activities” in the Tax Code of Azerbaijan (Article 11).

The Code classifies the taxes in Azerbaijan into state, autonomy republic and municipal taxes based on the territory they cover. State taxes are obligatory in the whole territory of Azerbaijan and includes income tax of natural person, profit tax of legal entities, VAT, excise tax, property tax, land use tax, road fund tax, mining tax and simplified tax.

Parties of tax relations 

 Parties of relations regulated by tax legislation are following: 
 Individuals and legal entities recognized by this Code as taxpayers;
 Individuals and legal entities recognized by this Code as tax agents;
 State tax authorities of the Republic of Azerbaijan;
 Customs authorities of the Republic of Azerbaijan;
 Financial bodies of the Republic of Azerbaijan (related to solving the issues envisaged by this Code);
 Others than tax and custom officers conducting the collection and transfer of funds from taxpayers to the budget according to this Code.

Taxpayer’s rights and responsibilities 
Taxpayers have the rights to get comprehensive written information about taxes and tax regulations; take advantages of tax privileges in the cases regulated by this Code; demand timely return or redemption of overpaid or overcharged taxes; receive copies of documents prepared as the result of tax inspection; follow no decisions and requirements of tax officials that do not comply with the Code; require not to reveal confidential information; demand full payment of damages resulting from illegal acts or actions (inaction) of tax authorities, and appeal to the court on the actions or inaction of tax officials in accordance with the Code.

Taxpayers are responsible for paying taxes and other obligatory fees determined in the Code; getting TIN (taxpayer’s identification number) from tax authorities; keeping records of revenues and expenses, as well as taxation objects; submitting tax report and required documents to the authorities.

Amendments 
The Tax Code of Azerbaijan has been amended several times; the last amendments were made in December 2018 which is aimed to reduce the scale of tax evasion and “shadow economy”, expand the taxable base, improve tax administration, support the development of entrepreneurship and increase the economic efficiency of existing and new tax exemptions.  According to the amendments, employees of non-oil sectors with a monthly salary up to 8.000 manat get 100% tax exemption, while the tax rate for the employees with a monthly salary more than 8.000 manat has reduced from 25% to 14%. Moreover, the simplified tax is set to be 2% throughout the country which was previously 4% in Baku and 2% in the regions.

Micro-enterprises and small businesses got exemption from property tax, furthermore, startups in the small and medium businesses segment will not pay profit or income tax for a 3 years period after getting the certificate for startup activity. Small and medium business will be free from profit tax, land tax and value-added tax for a period of 7 years.

See also 

 Taxation in Azerbaijan
 Ministry of Taxes of Azerbaijan

References 

Tax codes
Law of Azerbaijan